The Lancashire League has been the name of two separate football competitions for clubs based in northern England.

Lancashire League (1889 to 1903)

The original Lancashire League was formed in 1889, and was established because of the success of the Football League, which had been established just one year earlier. Prime movers in the formation of the league were the officials of Bury Football Club, who had ambitions to set up a regional competition which would be a stepping stone for them and other clubs to gain a place in the Football League.

Although the majority of the clubs were based in the county of Lancashire, the league did eventually accept several clubs from neighbouring Cheshire. Additionally from further afield, Workington, from Cumberland, were members for two seasons, while Doncaster Rovers, from Yorkshire, were also to make an application to join.
 
The league survived for fourteen seasons until 1903, and in 1903–04 it became the Second Division of the Lancashire Combination. At the time the Lancashire League was probably the stronger of the two competitions, and within a few years many of the former Lancashire League clubs had become leading Lancashire Combination clubs.

The Lancashire League had many member clubs who would later take up places in the Football League. These included Accrington Stanley, Blackpool, Bury, Crewe Alexandra,   
Liverpool, Nelson, New Brighton Tower, Southport Central, and Stockport County.

Champions

Member clubs
A total of 47 clubs and reserve teams played in the league during its first incarnation:

Accrington
Ashton North End
Bacup
Barrow
Blackburn Park Road
Blackburn Rovers Reserves
Blackpool
Bolton Wanderers Reserves
Burnley Union Star
Bury
Chorley
Clitheroe
Crewe Alexandra
Darwen
Earlestown
Fairfield
Fleetwood Rangers
Halliwell Rovers
Haydock
Heywood Central
Heywood
Higher Walton
Horwich
Hyde
Liverpool
Liverpool South End
Middleton
Nelson
New Brighton Tower
Oldham County
Oswaldtwistle Rovers
Prescot
Rochdale
Rossendale
South Liverpool
South Shore
Southport Central
St Helens Recreation
St Helens Town
Stalybridge Rovers
Stockport County
West Manchester
White Star Wanderers
Wigan County
Wigan United
Witton
Workington

Lancashire League (1939 to date)

The second Lancashire League was formed in 1939, and for the 1939–40 season it was a competition mainly for the 'A' teams of Lancashire Football League clubs; however, with the onset of World War II, the new league was to last only one season before being abandoned.

In 1949 the league was re-established, and for almost fifty years it was a competition largely for the junior sides of the Lancashire-based Football League clubs. For most seasons, two divisions were operated; however, for a short period from the late 1950s there were three divisions. Some non-league clubs' reserve sides were later accepted into membership, and with the Football League taking a greater responsibility for youth football in recent seasons, the Lancashire League is now a competition exclusively for non-league clubs' reserve sides. From 2006–07 the league was sponsored by Lancit Haulage Limited, and from 2010–11 the league has been sponsored by GalaxyFootball.co.uk.

Champions

References

External links
Official website
Lancashire League FA Full Time

 
Football in Lancashire
Reserve football leagues in England
1889 establishments in England
1903 disestablishments
Sports leagues established in 1889
Defunct football leagues in England